The 1997 National League Division Series (NLDS), the opening round of the 1997 National League playoffs, began on Tuesday, September 30, and ended on Friday, October 3, with the champions of the three NL divisions along with a wild card team participating in two best-of-five series. They were:

(1) San Francisco Giants (Western Division champions, 90–72) vs. (4) Florida Marlins (Wild Card, 92–70): Marlins win series, 3–0.
(2) Houston Astros (Central Division champions, 84–78) vs. (3) Atlanta Braves (Eastern Division champions, 101–61): Braves win series, 3–0.

The Atlanta Braves and Florida Marlins went on to meet in the NL Championship Series (NLCS). The Marlins became the National League champions, and defeated the American League champion Cleveland Indians in the 1997 World Series.

Matchups

San Francisco Giants vs. Florida Marlins

Houston Astros vs. Atlanta Braves

San Francisco vs. Florida
The San Francisco Giants made it back to the postseason for the first time since the 1989 World Series. The Florida Marlins were in the postseason for the first time ever.

Game 1
Pro Player Stadium in Miami Gardens, Florida

Game 1 was a matchup between Kirk Rueter and Kevin Brown. Both pitchers were on even terms, allowing one run and four hits through seven innings. Both teams struck in the seventh with leadoff homers by Bill Mueller and Charles Johnson. The game was tied 1–1 in the bottom of the ninth inning With the bases loaded, Édgar Rentería singled to right to give the Marlins their first ever postseason win with a walk-off.

Game 2
Pro Player Stadium in Miami Gardens, Florida

Shawn Estes faced Al Leiter in an exciting Game 2. An RBI single by Mark Lewis made it 1–0 Giants in the first. The Marlins would strike back in the bottom half. Bobby Bonilla hit a two-run homer to make it 2–1 Marlins, but a homer by Brian Johnson tied the game in the second. Then Barry Bonds hit a sacrifice fly to give the Giants a 3–2 lead in the third. The Marlins tied it in the bottom half with an RBI single by Bonilla. Stan Javier's infield hit gave the Giants the lead back in the fourth. Hits by Alex Arias and Kurt Abbott gave the Marlins the lead in the bottom half. The Marlins would add another run on a homer by Gary Sheffield in the bottom of the sixth. It was 6–4, but the Giants refused to concede. An RBI double by Bonds made it a one-run game in the seventh. The one-run lead would stand into the ninth. With Robb Nen pitching, the Giants managed to tie the game thanks to a key error by Craig Counsell. However, the Marlins would not wait until extra innings to try to win. Sheffield led the inning off with a single; then he stole second. After Bonilla walked, Moisés Alou hit the game-winning single to center field. The ball was scooped up by Dante Powell, whose throw home was in line with home plate, but the ball hit the mound, allowing Sheffield to score easily. This play would be the defining moment of the series, being replayed many times on highlights, as well as mainstream shows such as Live with Regis and Kathie Lee. The Marlins took the series lead, 2–0.

Game 3
3Com Park at Candlestick Point in San Francisco, California

In Game 3, the Giants looked to Wilson Álvarez to keep them alive. Opposing him would be Alex Fernandez, hoping to close out the series. The game was scoreless until the bottom of the fourth, when Jeff Kent hit a home run with one out to make it 1–0 Giants. Later, however, the Marlins would put the series away when Devon White hit a stunning grand slam into the left field bleachers in the top of the sixth. Kent would hit another home run in the bottom half, but two RBI doubles by Charles Johnson and Craig Counsell put any hopes of a Giants comeback out of reach. Robb Nen got Damon Berryhill to ground out to end the series. In response to their team being swept, Giants fans littered the field with garbage as the Marlins players celebrated. This was the final MLB playoff game at Candlestick Park. Until 2016, this was the last time the Giants lost a postseason series at home. In their next 7 appearances, including the wildcard tiebreaker in 1998, they either lost the series on the road or won the World Series until finally losing at home in the 2016 NLDS. As of the 2016 season, this series is the last time the Giants were swept in the postseason.

Composite box
1997 NLDS (3–0): Florida Marlins over San Francisco Giants

Houston vs. Atlanta
The Houston Astros finally made it back to the postseason for the first time since the 1986 National League Championship Series. The Atlanta Braves were hosting their first postseason series at Turner Field. The Braves and Astros were formerly members of the National League West from 1969-1993.

Game 1

Game 1 was a matchup between Darryl Kile and Greg Maddux. Kenny Lofton led off the bottom of the first with a double, the first postseason hit at Turner Field. Keith Lockhart flied to right, putting Lofton at third. Then Chipper Jones hit a sacrifice fly to left field to make it 1–0 Braves in the first. Then Ryan Klesko homered to lead off the second, a homer which would prove to be the game winner. The Astros would strike for a run in the fifth, thanks to an RBI single by Kile. Maddux and Kile dueled for seven innings. Kile allowed only two hits and Maddux pitched a complete game.

Game 2

The Astros sent Mike Hampton to the mound against Tom Glavine. The game was quiet through the first  innings, but, in the bottom of the third, Jeff Blauser hit a three-run homer to put the Braves ahead. The Astros, however, would tie the game thanks to a two-run double by Brad Ausmus and an RBI single by Mike Hampton that scored Ausmus. The Astros would make a game of it, but only for the moment. With two outs in the bottom of the fifth, Hampton would surrender four consecutive walks to give the Braves the lead. Hampton would leave, but Mike Magnante gave up two more runs thanks to a two-run single by Greg Colbrunn. Next inning, Magnante allowed three singles, the last of which to Fred McGriff scoring a run. Ramón García walked Javy Lopez to load the bases before first baseman Jeff Bagwell's error on Andruw Jones's ground ball allowed two runs to score and put runners on second and third. Danny Bautista's two-run single extended the Braves' lead to 11–3. In the eighth, Lopez's two-run double off of Billy Wagner made it 13–3 Braves. Glavine pitched six innings for the win while Mike Cather and Mark Wohlers pitched three scoreless innings of relief to give the Braves a 2–0 series lead.

Game 3

Game 3 was a battle between John Smoltz and Shane Reynolds. Chipper Jones got the Braves started with a two-out homer in the top of the first. An RBI single by Jeff Blauser made it 2–0 in the second, and another RBI single, by Michael Tucker, made it 3–0 in the seventh. John Smoltz pitched brilliantly, allowing only three hits and one run, a homer by Chuck Carr, in a complete-game victory. A passed ball allowed one final insurance run to make it 4–1 Braves in the eighth. Bill Spiers grounded out in the bottom of the ninth to end the series.

Composite box
1997 NLDS (3–0): Atlanta Braves over Houston Astros

Notes

External links
FLA vs. SFG at Baseball-Reference
ATL vs. HOU at Baseball-Reference

National League Division Series
National League Division Series
Florida Marlins postseason
Atlanta Braves postseason
San Francisco Giants postseason
Houston Astros postseason
1997 in sports in California
1997 in sports in Georgia (U.S. state)
1997 in sports in Florida
1997 in sports in Texas
1997 in Atlanta
1997 in Houston
1997 in San Francisco
October 1997 sports events in the United States